Villayón is a municipality in the Autonomous Community of the Principality of Asturias, Spain. It is bordered on the north by Navia, on the west by Coaña, Boal and Illano, on the east by Valdés, Tineo y Allande and on the south by Allande.

History
Some prehistoric Hill Forts and Dolmen are still visitable in the municipality's territory. The Romans built some bridges here which are used today.

During the Middle Ages, Villayón belonged to Navia, Asturias.  The parish split off and became autonomous in 1868.

Geography 
The Río Navia passes through the municipality.  The waterfalls in Oneta (Cascada de Oneta) are the highest in Asturias.

Population 
From: INE Archiv

Parishes

The municipality contains six parishes:

Arbón
Busmente-Herías-La Muria
Oneta
Parlero 
Ponticiella 
Villayón (parish)

References

External links
Federación Asturiana de Concejos 
Guía del Occidente. Villayon 
Estado del Embalse del Arbon 

Municipalities in Asturias
Towns in Asturias